Vacation in Hell is the second studio album by the American hip hop trio, Flatbush Zombies. The album was released on April 6, 2018, through their own independent record label, Glorious Dead Recordings. The album received acclaim from critics who praised the album’s musical scope and the trio’s lyrics.

Cover art
The cover art of Vacation in Hell is inspired by a picture of Jimi Hendrix. Jimi Hendrix was posing together with the fellow members of The Jimi Hendrix Experience, Noel Redding and Mitch Mitchell, between two  naked women in that particular picture.

Critical reception
At Metacritic, which assigns a normalized rating out of 100 to reviews from mainstream publications, the album received an average score of 79 based on 4 reviews. Pitchfork gave the album a 7.1 out of 10 saying, "there will never be a shortage of New York rappers penning lifeless stan raps, and if hip-hop wants them around, it’s fine. But Flatbush Zombies have more to offer. Across Vacation in Hell, flashes of lucidity spirit the Zombies outside of their stiffened corpses and evoke a world of camaraderie and brotherhood amid loss and sacrifice."Exclaim! gave Vacation In Hell a 9 out of 10 saying, "Overall, the trio showcase legend influences in their lines, while still authentically being themselves."

Commercial performance
The album sold 27,140 album-equivalent units (12,921 pure) in the first week, debuting at number 11 on the US Billboard 200 chart.

Track listing
All tracks produced by Erick Arc Elliott, except where noted.

Notes
"Chunky" and "Trapped" contain additional vocals from Dia

Charts

References

2018 albums
Flatbush Zombies albums